Perbadanan Kemajuan Negeri Selangor Sports Complex (erroneously referred as Perbadanan Kemajuan Negari Selangor by cricket records) is a multi-purpose sports facility in Kelana Jaya, Petaling Jaya, Selangor which is used for cricket and football. It is located near MBPJ Stadium. Its first recorded use for cricket purposes came in 1991 when the ground hosted a match between Malaysia and Singapore in the Saudara Cup. 

In 1997, the ground held ten matches in the ICC Trophy.  The following year it held its first List A match when Australia played Canada as part of the cricket competition at the 1998 Commonwealth Games.  Six further List A matches were played there during the games, the last of which saw the final played between Australia and South Africa.  This match also saw the highest recorded attendance for a cricket match in Malaysia, with 7,532 witnessing a South African victory.

See also
 Sport in Malaysia

References

External links
Perbadanan Kemajuan Negari Selangor, Kuala Lumpur at CricketArchive

Cricket grounds in Malaysia
Football venues in Malaysia
Athletics (track and field) venues in Malaysia
Multi-purpose stadiums in Malaysia
Sports venues in Selangor